Anna Kamieńska-Łapińska (Rowiny, Drohiczyn Poleski County, 26 July 1932 – 29 June 2007, Warsaw) was a Polish sculptor and animated-film scenarist.

Life
In 1952–58 she studied in the Sculpture Department of the Warsaw Academy of Fine Arts with Professor Jerzy Jarnuszkiewicz. On 15 June 1958 she obtained a diploma with distinction. From the 1960s she participated in many Polish and foreign exhibitions.

Work

Her work may be classified as belonging to biological expressionism. She worked principally in small sculptural forms, in the media of ceramics, aluminum, bronze and cast iron. In the 1960s her chief subject was the natural world and its transformations—cycles of insects, lichens, corals, trees.

Ensuing years brought an interest in the human figure and scenes from everyday life. In 1963 she took third place in a competition for a Monument to the Heroes of Westerplatte.

In 1977 she co-authored a winning design for a monument to Bolesław Prus. The sculpture was executed in Warsaw in 1977.

Sculpture cycles
Moths—ceramic, 1965
Crabs—ceramic, 1968–70
Insects—ceramic, bronze, cast iron, 1969–80
Nuns—ceramic, 1975–80
Tables—ceramic, aluminum, 1974
Remembered scenes—ceramic, aluminum, 1974
Crowd portraits—ceramic, aluminum, 1975–85
Sculptures to fairy tales by Hans Christian Andersen–porcelain, 1988

See also
List of Poles

Notes

1932 births
2007 deaths
Academy of Fine Arts in Warsaw alumni
20th-century Polish sculptors
20th-century Polish women artists
21st-century Polish sculptors
21st-century Polish women artists